Chi Haotian (born 9 July 1929), also spelled as Chih Hao-tien, is a retired general of the Chinese People's Liberation Army. He served as Minister of National Defence from 1993 to 2003.

Biography 
Chi was born 9 July 1929 in Zhaoyuan, Shandong, Republic of China. In October 1946 he joined the Chinese Communist Party (CCP). He was recruited to the army in July 1945, and graduated from the synthesis department of Military Academy of PLA.

In 1973, he became the vice political commissar of Beijing Military Region, and vice editor in chief of a prominent newspaper "People's Daily". He later became vice director of the general staff department of PLA and the director of political department under it, the political commissar of Jinan Military Region, and the head of the general staff department of PLA as well as the secretary of CCP's committee there. He was elected as a member of central military commission in 1988.

In May and June 1989, Chi played an important role in directing the military's enforcement of martial law in Beijing to suppress the Tiananmen Square Protests in the national capital.  As chief of staff he instructed the commanding officers of the Beijing, Shenyang, and Jinan Military Districts to "finalize the name list of every group army division scheduled to advance into Beijing and their exact times of departure and arrival, as well as details regarding primary duties", according to the "Daily report" (Meiri yibao) from the Central Military Commission Office, dated 19 May 1989. This military buildup resulted in the so-called Beijing massacre, which took place on 4 June that year.

In 1993 Chi became a state council member and the Minister of National Defense until 2003. He was also the director of the Law of National Defense Draft Commission. He was elected to be vice chairman of the central military commission of the CCP in September 1995, and CMC of the state in December that year. On 19 October 1999, after meeting with Syrian Defence Minister Mustafa Tlass in Damascus, Syria, to discuss expanding military ties between China and Syria, Chi then flew directly to Israel and met with Ehud Barak, the then prime minister and Defence Minister of Israel where they discussed military relations. Among the military arrangements, was a 1 billion dollar Israeli Russian sale of military aircraft to China, which were to be jointly produced by Russia and Israel.

He was elected as a member of central committee of CCP's 12th, 13th, 14th and 15th National Congresses, and a Politburo member at 15th Congress. He was awarded First-class honor in 1952, and Third-Class Liberation medal in 1985. He was made general in 1988.

References

External links
Chinatoday biography
Chi Haotian at China Vitae

1929 births
Living people
Ministers of National Defense of the People's Republic of China
People's Liberation Army generals from Shandong
Politicians from Yantai
Chinese Communist Party politicians from Shandong
People's Republic of China politicians from Shandong
People's Liberation Army Chiefs of General Staff
State councillors of China
Members of the 12th Central Committee of the Chinese Communist Party
Members of the 13th Central Committee of the Chinese Communist Party
Members of the 14th Central Committee of the Chinese Communist Party
Members of the 15th Politburo of the Chinese Communist Party
Delegates to the 2nd National People's Congress
Delegates to the 3rd National People's Congress
Delegates to the 7th National People's Congress
Delegates to the 8th National People's Congress
Delegates to the 9th National People's Congress
1989 Tiananmen Square protests and massacre